Lamprosema sibirialis is a moth in the family Crambidae. It was described by Pierre Millière in 1879. It is found in Russia (Siberia, Amur), Korea, China and Japan.

The wingspan is 15–18 mm. Both the forewings and hindwings have complicated patterns with a light yellow colour on the inner side of the postmedial
line. Adults are on wing from May to October.

References

Moths described in 1879
Lamprosema
Moths of Asia